Ben Leeds Carson (born 24 August 1971) is an American composer and educator.

Biography 
Carson was born in Raleigh, North Carolina; throughout the early 1970s his parents did surveying work for the United States Geological Service, trekking through nearly every state in the United States. He would later describe his experiences of those travels, and seeing diverse landscapes through his father's geomorphologist lens, as influential in his approach to musical time. After undergraduate studies at Willamette University, he completed graduate degrees at University of Washington with John Rahn, and at the University of California, San Diego, where he worked with Brian Ferneyhough, George Lewis, and Roger Reynolds. In 1999, Carson was a resident artist funded by the French Ministry of Culture at IRCAM and Paris University VI, collaborating with psycho-acousticians Stephen McAdams and Daniel Matzkin. In 2003, Carson joined the composition faculty at the University of California, Santa Cruz, where he was also Provost of Kresge College from 2015 to 2022; he has served as a visiting scholar at Columbia University, as a visiting artist with UC Colorado Springs Peak Frequency Ensemble (2010), and an artist-in-residence at Shanghai Conservatory (2018).

Music 
Carson's music generally involves mixtures of spontaneous and planned composition, with a particular attention to the question of how aural experience is shaped by pulse, its fluctuation, or its absence; Los Angeles Times critic Mark Swed has described the live experience of one work as "a kind of acoustic acupressure." Carson's early work includes Détale, for contrabass and chamber orchestra, which took first prize in chamber music at the British and International Bass Festival (2000); festival curators praised it as "confident, impressive, and independent…the range of textures and timbres explored adds to the success of the work. [Détale] has much to say…a strong rhythmic momentum and propulsion…carefully placed texture and spare writing…every note is important.". Contrasting themes of momentum and the isolation of individual notes would resurface in essays on Carson's piano music by critic Christopher Williams, who notes that phrases often set up temporary dichotomies that quickly shift and re-form, so that "each element defines and becomes the other… [offering us] the opportunity and responsibility to navigate our own uniquely useful paths."

Carson's works frequently engage themes of interiority, and the challenge of an unanchored consciousness—the latter informed by scholarship on Gilles Deleuze and William James. At a John Cage Centennial symposium at the New School for Social Research (NYC), critic Gretchen Till likened a performance of Carson's indeterminate speech-focused score Piece for Four Strangers to "being in a system in the moment that produces contemporary visibility; and engaging a process to test the way in which something works or develops,” and noted a fluidity between experiences of performance and observation, producing "transitions as a way of forming a sense of self". Those features would come to animate Carson's collections of percussion music, and piano music, reportedly exercises in "the establishment and erosion of musical boundaries, the evolution/devolution of melody, and the use of silence as a structural component ... [yielding] fortes that produce an impact out of proportion with their amplitude."

Collaborations involving Carson since 2012 have included an opera-in-progress based on Star Trek characters, with a libretto co-written by John de Lancie, a long set of duo compositions for haegeum player Soo-yeon Lyuh and Bang-on-a-Can cellist Ashley Bathgate, premiered at the Smithsonian's Meyer Series (October 2019), and a set of duos and trios for a range of Germany- and Austria-based artists, released (August 2022) as a vinyl record, By A Moment And A Word, on Chicago-based Sideband Records. Composer Richard Barrett described By A Moment And A Word as "music being reinvented from first principles...as if every sound, every familiar interval, and, most crucially, every structural turning point, is being heard for the first time"

References 

American composers
University of California, Santa Cruz faculty
1971 births
Living people